Saudi Arabia–Palestine relations refers to the bilateral relationship between the Kingdom of Saudi Arabia and the State of Palestine.

Although the State of Palestine has an embassy in Riyadh, Saudi Arabia does not have one in Ramallah. Both countries are members or observers of the Arab League, the Organization of Islamic Cooperation, and the United Nations. In recent years, there have been rumors indicating behind-the-scenes diplomatic and intelligence cooperation between Saudi Arabia and Israel, in pursuit of mutual goals against Iran. However, Saudi Arabia supports the establishment of a Palestinian state on the basis of pre-1967 borders, with East Jerusalem as its capital.

History
While Saudi Arabia tends to be a sympathizer of Palestine after the 1948 Arab–Israeli War, Saudi Arabia has distanced itself from the conflict and emphasizes in a friendlier approach. Nonetheless, at the reign of King Faisal, a liberal ruler in Saudi history and firmly pro-Palestinian, Saudi Arabia had set up closer ties with Palestine and supportive of the Palestinian cause to a level after the 1973 Arab–Israeli War, he withdrew Saudi oil from market, causing the 1973 oil crisis. The new oil revenue also allowed Faisal to greatly increase the aid and subsidies begun following the 1967 Six-Day War to Egypt, Syria, and the Palestine Liberation Organization. However, he was assassinated two years later, and the relationship once warm under Faisal, became soured for the second time.

During the 1991 Gulf War, the Palestinian leadership of Yasser Arafat openly supported Saddam Hussein's Iraq invading Kuwait. As Kuwait is Saudi Arabia's cultural and political ally, this prompted tensions between Saudi Arabia and Palestine and continue to have a significant legacy on it, since it fueled the eventual distrust of Saudi Arabia against Palestine. Since then, relations between Saudi Arabia and Palestine have been largely up-and-down, with Saudi Arabia accused of helping Israel, declining aids from Saudi Arabia and increasing Iranian aids to Palestine, while Iran is Saudi Arabia's arch-foe from 1979.

Modern opinions
While Saudis tend to maintain a strongly sympathizing view on Palestinians, especially among the older generations, Palestinians view Saudi Arabia unfavorably, due to rumors that Saudi Arabia was accused to be working with Israel against its people, distrust of Saudi officials and its political approaches deemed to be anti-Palestinian.

Amongst the House of Saud, there is a divide over the potential embrace of Israel. The current King of Saudi Arabia, Salman, has expressed his support for an independent Palestinian state based on pre-1967 borders. A prominent Saudi prince, Turki bin Faisal Al Saud, known to be close to King Salman, expressed his support for an independent state based on pre-1967 borders. At a Bahrain security summit that was remotely attended by Israel’s foreign minister, al-Faisal accused Israel of depicting itself as a “small, existentially threatened country, surrounded by bloodthirsty killers who want to eradicate her from existence”. The Crown Prince of Saudi Arabia, Mohammed bin Salman, reportedly stated in 2018 that "Palestinians should accept peace or 'shut up and stop complaining'", which prompted protests from Palestinians over his remark. However, Saudi King Salman once again attempted to confirm their support to Palestine in a meeting with Palestinian President Mahmoud Abbas. According to recent reports, a rift has been growing between King Salman and Mohammed bin Salman ever since. Another Saudi prince, 
Bandar bin Sultan Al Saud, was interviewed by Al Arabiya in 2020. During the interview, he lashed out at Palestinian leadership for its failures, and stated, “The Palestinian cause is a just cause but its advocates are failures, and the Israeli cause is unjust but its advocates have proven to be successful.” He noted that Saudi Arabia has always backed Palestine despite its leadership's repeated mistakes. However, experts made claims criticizing the interview for being insincere, noting that Bandar would not have received so much airtime on Al-Arabiya had his message not jibed with the wishes of the Crown Prince of Saudi Arabia, Mohammed bin Salman.

See also 
 Embassy of the State of Palestine in Saudi Arabia
 Foreign relations of Palestine
 Foreign relations of Saudi Arabia

References 

 
Bilateral relations of Saudi Arabia
Saudi Arabia